Zvonimir Črnko (1 August 1936 – 25 January 2008) was a Croatian actor. He appeared in more than thirty films from 1963 to 1985.

Filmography

References

External links 

1936 births
2008 deaths
People from Velika Gorica
Croatian male film actors